Stuart Malcolm Eustace, born 3 May 1979 in Birmingham, is an English cricketer. He is a left-handed batsman and a wicketkeeper who started playing Twenty20 cricket in 2005 for Warwickshire. He has also played Minor Counties cricket for Devon and has played in one first-class match for Warwickshire.

References

1979 births
Living people
English cricketers
Warwickshire cricketers
Devon cricketers
Wicket-keepers